Bauhaus are an English rock band formed in Northampton in 1978. Known for their dark image and gloomy sound, Bauhaus are one of the pioneers of gothic rock, although they mixed many genres, including dub, glam rock, psychedelia, and funk. The group consists of Daniel Ash (guitar, saxophone), Peter Murphy (vocals, occasional instruments), Kevin Haskins (drums) and David J (bass).

The band formed under the name Bauhaus 1919, in reference to the first operating year of the German art school Bauhaus, but they shortened this name within a year of formation. Their 1979 debut single "Bela Lugosi's Dead" is considered one of the harbingers of gothic rock music and has been influential on contemporary goth culture. Their debut album, In the Flat Field, is regarded as one of the first gothic rock records. Their 1981 second album Mask expanded their sound by incorporating a wider variety of instruments—such as keyboards, saxophone and acoustic guitar—and experimenting with funk-inspired rhythms on tracks like "Kick in the Eye". Bauhaus went on to achieve mainstream success in the United Kingdom with their third album, The Sky's Gone Out, which peaked at No. 3 on the UK Albums Chart in 1982. That same year, they also reached No. 15 on the Singles Chart with a standalone cover of David Bowie's "Ziggy Stardust", earning them an appearance on Top of the Pops. During recording sessions for their next album, Murphy fell ill and spent much of his time away from the studio, leaving the rest of the band to compensate for his absence. This created a rift between the singer and his bandmates, culminating in the group's dissolution on 5 July 1983, one week before Burning from the Inside was released. Featuring the hit single "She's in Parties", it would be their final studio album composed entirely of new material for a quarter century.

After Bauhaus' breakup, Murphy formed Dalis Car with Japan's bassist Mick Karn before beginning a solo career later on, while Ash and Haskins continued as Tones on Tail and, later, reunited with David J to form Love and Rockets. Both enjoyed greater commercial success in the United States than Bauhaus had but disappeared from the charts in their homeland. Bauhaus eventually reunited for a 1998 tour, again from 2005 to 2008, and once again in 2019.

History

Daniel Ash, his friend David J. Haskins, and Haskins' younger brother Kevin, had played together in various bands since childhood such as "Jam" and "Jackplug & The Sockets", where they would play cover songs from the Rolling Stones and The Beatles. Ash initially tried to convince his school friend Peter Murphy to be in a band, but nothing came out of it. According to Ash: "Pete didn't think about it at all, it wasn't on his mind as such." One of the longer-lived of these was a band called the Craze, which performed a few times around Northampton in 1978. However, the Craze still split up fairly quickly, and Ash once again tried to convince his old school friend Murphy to join him, simply because Ash thought he had the right look for a band. Murphy, who was working in a printing factory, decided to give it a try, despite never having written any lyrics or music. During their first rehearsal, he co-wrote the song "In the Flat Field".

Ash's old bandmate Kevin Haskins joined as the drummer. Ash made a point of not inviting David J, the driving force in their previous bands, because he wanted a band he could control. Instead, Chris Barber was brought in to play bass, and together the four musicians formed the band S.R. However, within a few weeks Ash relented, and replaced Barber with David J, who suggested the new name Bauhaus 1919. David J. had already agreed to tour American airbases with another band but decided that joining his friends' group was "the right thing to do". With their lineup complete, the band played their first gig at the Cromwell pub in Wellingborough on New Year's Eve 1978.

The band had chosen the name Bauhaus 1919, a reference to the German Bauhaus art movement of the 1920s, because of its "stylistic implications and associations", according to David J. The band also chose the same typeface used on the Bauhaus college building in Dessau, Germany, as well as the Bauhaus emblem, designed by Oskar Schlemmer. Bauhaus associate Graham Bentley said that the group was unlike any Northampton band of the time, most of which played predominantly cover songs. Bentley videotaped a performance by the group, which was sent to several record labels, in the hope of obtaining a contract. This approach was hindered partly because many record companies at the time did not have home video equipment, so the group decided to record a demo.

"Bela Lugosi's Dead" and 4AD

Bela Lugosi's Dead

After only six weeks as a band, Bauhaus entered the studio for the first time at Beck Studios in Wellingborough to record a demo. In rehearsal for the demo, the band experimented with echo and delay on the drums. One of the five tracks recorded during the session, "Bela Lugosi's Dead", more than nine minutes long, was released as the group's debut single in August 1979 on Small Wonder Records. The band was listed simply as Bauhaus, with the "1919" abandoned.

"Bela Lugosi's Dead" was strongly influenced by the band's interest in reggae and dub; where the bass and the drums were pushed upfront. It was the band's first recording they ever made and completed in the first take. It was also the first time Murphy ever sang in a studio microphone. Murphy was sick with a cold when he recorded the song. Kevin Haskins' drumbeat was based on a Bossa nova style of drumming. Daniel Ash explained how the inception of the song began when he talked with David J in regards to a riff he made: "I was talking to David (J, bass) on the blower one night and told  him I had this riff, using these trick chords that had a very haunting quality to it. He went: "It's so weird you should say that because I’ve got these lyrics about Bela Lugosi, the actor who played a vampire."" David J further elaborated: "There was a season of old horror films on TV, and I was telling Daniel about how much I loved them. The one that had been on the night before was Dracula [1931]. I was saying how Bela Lugosi was the quintessential Dracula, the elegant depiction of the character." Ash elaborated about the chords: "My riff has these mutant chords – they're not even minor chords – but it's rooted in an old Gary Glitter song, slowed right down. I didn't realize that when I was doing it." Ash also explained how he was able to achieve the echo effects for the song: "...David had this old HH echo unit, which would crap out on you all the time. We hooked up the guitar and snare drum to this echo unit and I was just sliding the HH amp thing to trigger all these echoes as the song went through." David explained the process of how they recorded the song: "We didn't really talk about what we were doing. Daniel started scratching away on the guitar, Kevin started his rhythm and there was this atmosphere building. I came in with those descending chords and Peter was just prowling up and down, slowly, like a big cat."     
 
On the origins of the song, Murphy explained: "We'd been talking about the erotic quality of vampire movies, even if they were the Hammer horror type. There was this conversation about the sexuality and eroticism of Dracula. Danny talked about his fascination with this and the occult connotations. So, we carried on that conversation and made it into a song." Murphy also elaborated: "There's an erotic, alluring element to the vampire. We didn't want to write an ode to Bela Lugosi, ostensibly. The kitsch element was his name because he was the biggest icon, yet he was the most unlikely vampire-looking person. So there was that Brit angle to it, but it wasn't at all negative. It was perfect. The idea of Bela Lugosi being dead or undead is classic." The band was initially nervous about their song due to its length as various record labels refused to issue the single due to the song being too long. Haskins explained the frustration the band faced with the song's length: "Danny took an acetate around all the big companies – Virgin, EMI and the rest – and they all said similar things: “This is the sort of thing I listen to at home, but it's not commercial.” Or: “It's way too long. Can you edit it down to three minutes?” Even Beggars Banquet turned us down, which is ironic because we ended up on that label." However, Peter Stennet of Small Wonder Records accepted and was insistent on putting out the record by favorably comparing it to Velvet Underground's single Sister Ray.

The single received a positive review in Sounds, and stayed on the British independent charts for two years. The song received crucial airplay on BBC Radio 1 and DJ John Peel's evening show and Bauhaus were subsequently asked to record a session for Peel's show, which was broadcast on 3 January 1980. Murphy gave his account of the John Peel session: "We walked up to reception, passing Motörhead on their way out, and said, "Hello, we're Bauhaus and we're friends of John Peel. We'd like to go up please." Somehow, we were allowed up there and we put the record in front of him. After we'd all introduced ourselves, he said on air, "We’ve got Bauhaus in the studio, they're from Northampton and they have a new single out called "Bela Lugosi's Dead". It's nine-and-a-half minutes long and this will probably be the first and last time I'll play this." Then we left and went down to listen to it in the car. Apparently, the BBC switchboard was jammed with listeners wanting him to play it again." Of the additional tracks, Classic Rock wrote that, "The rest of the material finds a band fumbling for direction, even touching on ska."

In the Flat Field
Despite the success of their signature song, the band left Small Wonder Records due to its lack of support for touring due to budget issues. As Stennet put it: “The trouble is we just can't afford to send the bands on tour or anything like that, and a group needs that sort of support”. Signing with the 4AD label, the band released two more singles, "Dark Entries" in January 1980 and "Terror Couple Kill Colonel" in June 1980, before issuing their first album In the Flat Field in October 1980. The album cover for the album was chosen by David J and it was a photograph called Homage to Purvis de Chavannes by Duane Michals, which depicts an image of a naked man blowing a type of trumpet. Reviewer Andy Gill from NME  described it as "Gothick-Romantick pseudo-decadence" and ultimately dismissed the band as "a hip Black Sabbath". Despite negative reviews, In the Flat Field topped the indie charts, and made headway on the UK Albums Chart, peaking for one week at No. 72. While the band was satisfied with the album, they admit that it didn't capture everything that they wanted. They felt the LP was a little too intense; however, it was "the purest statement of what [we] were like then". 
 
In August 1980, the band traveled to North America to play four dates in cities such as Toronto, Chicago, and New York. One of Bauhaus' first US shows was in a venue called Space Place in Chicago, Illinois in September 1980, booked by Jim Nash and Dannie Flesher, the owners of the independent record label Wax Trax! Records. The band returned to England in October 1980 for a 20-date tour in England and in Europe to promote their first album. In December 1980, Bauhaus released a cover of "Telegram Sam", a hit by glam rock pioneers T. Rex, as a single.

Beggars Banquet and breakup

Mask
Bauhaus' growing success outstripped 4AD's resources, so the band moved to 4AD's parent label, Beggars Banquet Records. Bauhaus released "Kick in the Eye" in March 1981 as its debut release on the label. The single reached No. 59 on the charts. The following single, "The Passion of Lovers", peaked at No. 56 in July 1981. Murphy said, "One of our loves is to make each single totally different from the last, not to be tied down by a style or sound." Bauhaus released their second album, Mask, in October 1981. The band employed more keyboards, and a variety of other instruments, to add to the diversity of the record. The front and back cover of the album was an impressionistic drawing made by Ash. In an unconventional move, the group shot a video for the album's title track as a promotional tool for the band, rather than any specific song from the record. David J explained the techniques, effects and his reaction regarding the content of the title track: "I can still recall with crystal clarity overdubbing the echoed bass part and using a metal bottleneck to achieve the cascade effect that comes in at the point where Daniel's acoustic twelve-string part starts. Hearing these sounds in ultra-sharp coke-intensified focus through headphones produced an ecstatic heart-bursting emotion on the edge of orgasmic release." The film crew consists of Chris Collins and Ken Lawrence of Standard Pictures. The video was made with a minuscule budget; the gear used in the video were powered off car batteries and roll film, and filmed in a hazardous building in Northampton, which was just across the road from the main police station. David J explains how the band and film crew broke into the building to make the video: "We snuck into this place about three in the morning and the lights kept going down at crucial moments so we'd have to wait and sit around in complete darkness...the place was dripping wet although it all added to the atmosphere." The video's imagery and lighting borrowed heavily from German Expressionism. David J commented on the content of the music video: "We improvised around the loose idea of a ritualistic resurrection, with Peter lain out like a corpse on a wooden slab. Each of us would administer some kind of shamanistic voodoo to assist in the raising of the dead. The place was freezing cold, dank, and dripping with filthy water. The lights kept going out, and we would be plunged into complete darkness until they were restored." When the scenes of the factory were finished, the group went to another location for filming. David J explained: "Once we had filmed the scenes in the factory, we set off for a second location: the woods on the grounds of the Spencer family's country estate - another illegal situation, and a potential threat to the monarchy. We did have fun that night! The finished film looked great: a fog-cloaked atmospheric drama that was redolent of a German expressionist silent horror flick." David J also mentioned that the music video was more of an art piece than a traditional music video and commented that Chris Collins "did a brillant job of capturing the visual essence of the band." Chris Collins commented on the motive of the video: "Foremost in our minds was to make something interesting, so somebody who'd never heard of Bauhaus before and suddenly saw that video might say, "God, that's really interesting, I want to know more about that". Ken Lawrence also explained the film's intention: "Every film about a band should show the strengths of that artist. So of course "Mask" is a promo because hopefully, it's what Bauhaus are about. If you listen to their lyrics at all, if you know the way their music is structured - it's thought provoking, it evokes mood and it's very atmospheric music and that was our approach to making the film." It made only one appearance on British TV. Around the same time, "In keeping with our surrealist leaning...", the band also employed the "exquisite corpse" technique to an experimental film they made called "Consequences", where each member was given an amount of time to film whatever they wished. It was shown on tour in place of a support band. The band toured broadly to promote the album by playing a 16-date tour of England and 13 dates in Europe.

"Spirit" and The Sky's Gone Out

In July 1982 Bauhaus released the single "Spirit", produced by Hugh Jones. This was unusual for the band since they tend to produce their own music and, as a result of this move, led to conflicts and compromises in the studio. As David J explains the predicament: "It took ages and ages. Usually we recorded very quickly - we'd do an album in three weeks from start to finish - but that took about nine days, which for us was absurd. There was so much agonising over it more from the producer than us." The song used an acoustic guitar with a bossa nova drumbeat. According to Shirley, The song was about: "...a "fifth member" of the band - a spirit they felt occupied the stage, lifting them to a higher plane when they were playing well." The music video was directed by Collins and Lawrence. Originally, the video was to show a physical representation of this spirit which included "a single dancer with a white facemask and body paint who would come onto the stage whilst the band performed the song and literally "lift" Peter and give him wings." However, this didn't happen since once the band completed their part, they had to depart in a hurry in order to do their tour of the United States. So, Collins and Lawrence were responsible for the editing process and completion of the video. They changed the spirit figure and exchange it with a spectral female figure "who would walked through the theatre along with a motley crew of clowns and jugglers." When the band came back from their tour of the United States, they were repelled by the music video and wanted to redo it. However, their record label refused as the band was already given a budget for the video and was not interested into providing more money for it. Despite this, the band was still unrelenting and still wanted to change the video. As David J explains: "So we raised the money ourselves out of our own bank balances and pooled our money and so we went in and re-edited it, trying to get it into some kind of shape. We did it. Delivered the master to Beggars Banquet. Next week - this was at the time of the video jukebox craze - we went into a pub and we see the original horrible version on the video. So we immediately rang Beggars Banquet and said; "What's going on?" and they'd send out the wrong one and it had gone off to TV and everyhing." It was intended to break into the Top 30, but only reached No. 42. The band was also displeased with the single, and re-recorded it later in 1982 for their third album The Sky's Gone Out. Also when they played a gig in Salford University in 1982, Nico joined the band for a cover performance of the Velvet Underground song, I'm Waiting for the Man.

For their third LP, The Sky's Gone Out, based on their previous experience with their producer of their song "Spirit", they originally wanted to produce the album themselves as they knew what they should sound like. However, this led to problems in the studio as arguments between the band members would flare up based on their individual disagreements on how to make the album. The results of the album was due to the whole band's decision as a group and efforts of compromise. The band understood that they were too closely aligned to their work to have an objective take on their music, and was in need of a person from a third party that wasn't a producer however, one that makes suggestions and elucidations for their album without exerting a dominating effect on the band. This resulted with Derek Tompkins as their third party person. Derek Thompson commented on his agreement as an engineer of the album: "I was, however, quite willing to act as an engineer provided the resident engineer was responsible for the engineering and I was only responsible for interpreting what they wanted to him and helping a bit creatively myself." The band were booked into Rockfield Studios in Wales for one month to record the album. The band at the time had little original material written for the assembly due to the constant touring which didn't allowed to have enough time to write and rehearse new material. As Murphy explained: "The third LP was one of those unwritten albums that was done on the spot. An album of experimentation which was enjoyable to us because we didn't have any songs and we didn't feel like writing stuff and we said, "OK that's fine. If we don't have any songs we'll make the songwriting environment the studio." Although the sessions went well, there were some issues between the engineer and the band as the members would spend hours on laying down tracks until they got exactly what they wanted. However, this was solved with Derek Thompson as a mediator of the sessions. As Thompson explained: "I was a link to eliminate any strain between the two. A lot of things they did the engineer knew was not right but I used to say to him, "Don't worry about it, when it comes to the mix they'll throw it out. Don't worry they're just putting down stuff to work with. The creative part will come with the mix." Despite Thompson not understanding the music or lyrics of the album, he mentions: "I always used to ask them what the song was about so I knew what mood I was aiming for". Some of the lyrics of the album reflected the band's personal feelings and experiences. For example, one of the songs from the LP All We Ever Wanted Was Everything was according to David J, "evokes nostalgic memories of a time of innocence and naive yearning." David J also praised Murphy on the song by saying his singing: "...emoting the bittersweet sentiment so perfectly, every word ringing true."

In the same year, Bauhaus scored their biggest hit with a cover of David Bowie's "Ziggy Stardust", which was recorded during a BBC session. The song was chosen by the band in spite of their critics who accused them of being "Bowie plagiarists", a label that they were quite annoyed with. Ash explained that the band didn't care about their critics and "...so we thought we'd do the opposite of what they'd expect and promptly release 'Ziggy'". The song reached No. 15 on the British charts, and earned the band an appearance on the television show Top of the Pops.  Due to the success of the single, the album also became the band's biggest hit, peaking at No. 3. That same year, Bauhaus made an appearance in the horror film The Hunger, where they performed "Bela Lugosi's Dead" during the opening credits. The final cut of the scene focused on Murphy; this, coupled with the singer's modelling work in a popular ad campaign for Maxell, caused resentment among the rest of the group.

Burning from the Inside

Prior to the recording of their fourth album, Burning from the Inside (1983), Murphy was stricken with pneumonia, which prevented him from contributing much to the album. Ash and David J took the reins, becoming the driving forces behind the record and even performing lead vocals on several tracks. One of the songs in the album, Who Killed Mister Moonlight was described by David J as a "surrealistic ballad inspired in part by the murder of John Lennon". Later on, the mysterious character of Mister Moonlight had a symbolic meaning, which was seen by the band "as being representative of the dreamy, poetic aspect of Bauhaus". The album's lead single, "She's in Parties", reached No. 26 on the charts and earned Bauhaus their third and final Top of the Pops appearance. Bauhaus then embarked on an international promotional tour for the album, with dates in Europe and the Far East. David J recalled that the night before they were supposed to perform two shows at Hammersmith Palais in London, the group decided to disband.

The band played their farewell show on 5 July 1983 at the Hammersmith Palais; dedicated fans had been warned by the band's crew not to miss the show, without telling them it was the last. After a long encore, consisting of some of their early songs, David J left the stage with the words "rest in peace". Burning from the Inside was released a week later. The album received largely positive reviews and reached No. 13 on the charts. Bauhaus released the single "Sanity Assassin" in limited quantities as a farewell gift for those who joined the group's fan club.

Post-Bauhaus careers and Solo projects 

During the band's initial lifecycle, solo projects would be initiated at times. For example, in 1981, while still being a member of Bauhaus, David J started a solo project in collaboration with Rene Halkett, who was one of the original students of the art school of their band name. The origins of this correspondence was due to Halkett's younger neighbor telling him of hearing about a group called Bauhaus on the John Peel Show on BBC radio. This intrigued Halkett and he soon wrote to Peel about getting in touch with the band. They eventually met, discussed poetry and decided to work with David by sending a cassette tape that contain Halkett orally citing two of his poems. After listening intensly on the tape, David decided to go a recording studio where he provided the backing music to the tape. This collabroation resulted as a single called "Armour/Nothing" which was released by 4AD. According to David J regarding the correspondence, "He wrote to John Peel when he was playing Bauhaus’ first record, Bela Lugosi's Dead, and Rene was then in his 70's and was an avid listener to John Peels show. He heard this and was intrigued that this band of young upstarts had usurped the name Bauhaus and he wrote to John Peel asking for more information. Peel sent me the letter and I was just amazed to be in contact with somebody from that time, so I wrote to Rene and we struck up this correspondence and in the end would meet up and I'd go down and visit him in his little cottage in Cornwall. We ended up making a record together, which was his poetry that I put to music. It was one of the first releases on 4AD. I would just go down and he would enthrall me with these stories of him appearing in these cabaret clubs in Weimar and dancing on the piano and letting off revolvers in the club and this whole sort of barbarous cabaret scene that he was intrinsically involved in. He met Bertolt Brecht and people like that, the surrealists came through and his teachers were Kandinsky and it was just amazing to have a friend from that time so that gave me a real insight, to actually be communicating with somebody that was there." Both Halkett and David were satisfied with the single. Halkett commented on his contribution to the single: "I felt that the two poems required something more than print because they depend on things which can only be expressed in musical signs... It (the single) falls between music and poetry and is not entirely either. With "Nothing" David has written a perfect arrangement for what is a quite concentrated philosophical idea and it becomes so much more than the words..."

After Bauhaus disbanded, the members of the band moved on to various solo work. Murphy worked briefly with bassist Mick Karn of Japan in the band Dalis Car, before going solo with such albums as 1986's Should the World Fail to Fall Apart, 1988's Love Hysteria and 1989's Deep. Ash had already started Tones on Tail with Bauhaus roadie Glen Campling as a side project in 1982; after Bauhaus broke up, Kevin Haskins joined the group, and the trio released an album and several EPs before breaking up after a 1984 American tour. During this time, David J released two solo albums and collaborated with other musicians, recording two albums with the Jazz Butcher, and also with comics writer/spoken-word artist Alan Moore in the short-lived band the Sinister Ducks.

During a discussion about the state of their projects at the time, Ash and David J began talking about reforming Bauhaus. All four band members arranged a rehearsal, but Murphy failed to show up on the scheduled day. The other three band members rehearsed regardless, and were inspired by the chemistry they had as a trio. As a result, Ash and the Haskins brothers formed Love and Rockets in 1985. Love and Rockets scored a US hit four years later with "So Alive". The band broke up in 1999 after seven albums. Both Ash and David J released solo albums during the Love and Rockets years; Murphy contributed backing vocals to David J's 1992 single "Candy on the Cross".

Subsequent developments: reunions and a final album 

Bauhaus reunited for the "Resurrection Tour" in 1998, their stage show opened with Double Dare and Pete Murphy singing to the audience via a TV screen set up centre-stage. The tour featured a new song, "The Dog's a Vapour", which was also included in the Heavy Metal 2000 film soundtrack. A live album was recorded during the tour, Gotham, which was released the following year. It included a studio recording of Bauhaus' cover of the Dead Can Dance song "Severance".

Bauhaus reunited again in 2005, playing that year's Coachella Festival in Indio, California. They opened their set with Murphy being lowered upside-down to the stage, singing "Bela Lugosi's Dead". The performance was critically acclaimed and ranked among the greatest and most memorable performances ever in Coachella. Following Murphy's 2005 tour, Bauhaus embarked on a full tour beginning in North America in autumn 2005, ending in Europe in February 2006. During the tour, Bauhaus covered Joy Division's "Transmission". The band also mentioned that they hoped to record new music. In May they performed as opening act for Nine Inch Nails on the summer leg of the latter's US tour.

In 2008, Bauhaus released their first new studio album since 1983, Go Away White (Cooking Vinyl). It marked the band's end and the album had no promotional tour. In late 2007, Kevin Haskins said "We were getting along really well, but there was an incident that occurred," and added that as a result, "Some of us just felt that we didn't want to carry on as a working unit." In early 2008, Murphy claimed that he "was most satisfied with the bonding on an emotional level. It was good to be working together and to put the past behind us and it was very positive. The result was coming out really fast, so it was exciting and it was very enjoyable", but in the end, "that rocky character worked and I think it was a bit right to finish it, really". The same year, David J commented on the breakup: "You have a test tube, and you pour in one chemical, and you pour in another chemical, and something happens. It starts to bubble. Pour in another chemical, and it starts to bubble a bit more. You pour in a fourth chemical, and it bubbles really violently, and then explodes. That's my answer".

In 2017, Ash and Kevin Haskins toured as Poptone with Haskins' daughter Diva Dompe on bass. The group performed songs from Bauhaus, Tones on Tail, and Love and Rockets along with cover songs. A live album recorded at various stops on the tour was released through PledgeMusic.

In 2018, Murphy and David J announced a tour of New Zealand, Australia and Europe to celebrate the 40th anniversary of Bauhaus, with the pair performing In the Flat Field in its entirety.

In September 2019, after a 13-year hiatus, Bauhaus announced a show at the 5,000-seat Hollywood Palladium with all original members on 3 November. A second show was added for the following night, after the first show sold out quickly. A third date at the same venue was then confirmed for 1 December.

In March 2022, Bauhaus released their first new song in fourteen years with "Drink the New Wine," which was recorded separately by all four members during COVID-19 lockdown. The recording process used the Exquisite Corpse method whereby each artist adds to the piece without hearing what the others have done.

Bauhaus toured the west coast of the United States and Europe in 2022 and was set to return to the east coast of the United States for more concerts before abruptly cancelling the tour on 31 August as Peter Murphy announced that he was entering rehab.

Musical style and influences

Influences

According to David J, the bands Bauhaus related to in the post-punk scene were Joy Division, Pere Ubu, Devo, Gang of Four, Cabaret Voltaire, and the Pop Group. Among bands and singers who influenced Bauhaus, they cited Siouxsie and the Banshees, David Bowie, T-Rex, Roxy Music, Syd Barrett's Pink Floyd, New York Dolls, Velvet Underground, Iggy Pop and the Stooges, The Doors, Alice Cooper, MC5, Ramones, the Sex Pistols, the Clash, the Residents, Captain Beefheart, Suicide, Kraftwerk, Neu!, Can, Faust, the Beatles, the Rolling Stones, the Who, Bob Dylan, Tom Waits, Serge Gainsbourg, Lee Scratch Perry, King Tubby, Mikey Dread, Kurt Weill, Scott Walker, and Jacques Brel. Specific recordings that were influential on the band include the compilation album Nuggets, Lou Reed's albums Berlin and Transformer, the Bits and Pieces single by the Dave Clark Five and the Double Barrel single by Dave and Ansell Collins.

In terms of early influences from childhood, David J said that he was interested in jazz and its musicians such as Miles Davis, Charlie Parker and Thelonious Monk. He has also listed Television's Marquee Moon as one of his all-time favorite albums. Peter Murphy cited Doris Day, Simon and Garfunkel, the Beatles, the Everly Brothers and his experiences from Mass in Catholic school as highly influential to his singing. He mentioned that the first 7-inch single he ever bought was "A Hard Day's Night" by the Beatles and also listed Brian Eno's Music for Airports as one of his favorite albums. Daniel Ash was interested in music at a young age, first being impressed by the stomping of the Dave Clark Five's "Bits and Pieces" song and later going through his older brother's music collection of records from the Beatles, the Rolling Stones, Faces and the Kinks. The first record he bought was Dave and Ansell Collins' "Double Barrel". When Ash was asked about how he developed his playing style and guitar influences, he replied: "My style of playing comes from a mixture of extreme laziness to learn proper scales/chords and a burning desire to sound original and new. Although I am a huge fan of Hendrix and Mick Ronson, Robert Fripp on Bowie tracks is also fab, and what about Earl Slick!" Ash also mentioned his appreciation of bands such as the Only Ones, the Damned, Television, Richard Hell and the Voidoids and said that the Stooges' Raw Power as one of his all-time favorite records. Kevin Haskins at 14 years old went to see Led Zeppelin and the drummer's (John Bonham) drum solo impressed him and called it "amazing". However at the same time, he was depressed as well due to feeling inadequate about his own musical abilities and never reaching the skill of Bonham. He even had thoughts of giving up music altogether. However, the nascent punk scene and seeing bands such as the Sex Pistols and The Clash gave him the confidence he needed to pursue in music.

Around 1970, David J's was intrigued by the Ska music, Roots reggae and Dub music coming out of Jamaica. He mentioned that Reggae "...was the first music that I was seriously into." It was from this exposure from these musical styles that made David J choose a bass guitar instead of a lead guitar. David explained: "I loved [Dub]. It was so exciting because it was my first exposure to this other world really. Something subterranean, dark, sexually charged, violent and compelling. This dark music was played in these dark places and was just captivating. I realised very quickly that what was powerful about this sound was the bass. I recalled that when we got guitars, no-one wanted to be the bass player - we had various bands just a bunch of friends who wanted to play pop music and they all wanted to play lead guitar - so I went; "Well, I'll play the bass". I retained my six string guitar and just played the bottom four strings and just used to play along with the records and work out the bass lines. I just got into it and found it really satisfying and saved up and bought a bass guitar."

Given their mixture of reggae and punk rock, Murphy said that musically, they were "more aligned to the Clash than anything else that was going around." When asked about the influence of reggae on Bauhaus' music, Murphy stated that it was "massive. We were listening to toasting music all the time, and David brought in a lot of bass lines that were very lead riffs [...] those bass lines really formed the basis of the music" In particular, dub reggae was highly influential to the band, so far that David J mentioned that their signature song, "Bela Lugosi's Dead", was intended as dub.

The band members Daniel, David and Kevin once attended a Rastafarian event that became quite influential to their music. As David explained: "At the time, Northampton had a large Rastafarian population, centred around the Matta Fancanta Youth Movement, which had its base at the old Salvation Army Citadel on the corner of Sheep Street, just across from Derngate Bus Station. It was run by Trevor Hall, whose uncle had started the famed Count Shelly sound system, which Trevor inherited. They would hold monthly events featuring two outfits competing against each other, spinning dub plates—instrumental tracks direct from Jamaica—and blasting them over the huge speakers while their respective ‘toasters’ took turns freestyling over the top. They would really go to town, painting up the entire place in the red, green, and gold of the Ethiopian flag and wearing suits and outsized hats to match, while the women would dye their hair. There were quotations from Haile Selassie all around the walls, and the air was thick with ganja smoke and the gamey aroma of goat's head soup. It was a true ‘temporary autonomous zone’, to quote the anarchist writer and poet Hakim Bey, and the police would wisely keep their distance. Daniel, Kevin, and I would be the only white faces in the throng, but there was never any trouble—quite the opposite—and the amazing music that we heard in that place became a big influence on us, ‘Bela Lugosi's Dead’ being a good example."

The band's other musical influences included various forms of rock (garage, glam, art, electronic, prog, psychedelic, heavy metal, folk, experimental, krautrock), as well as avant-garde music, ambient music, traditional pop, disco and funk. Outside of music, Bauhaus's influences were often artistic and literary and included William S. Burroughs, Brion Gysin, Allen Ginsberg, Jack Kerouac, Bertolt Brecht, Arthur Rimbaud, Charles Baudelaire, Comte de Lautréamont, Jean Cocteau, André Breton, Surrealism, German Expressionism, Greek Mythology, Ingmar Bergman, David Lynch, Oscar Wilde, Franz Kafka and Antonin Artaud. In regards to the influence of the original Bauhaus movement on the band, Murphy stated that "Bauhaus had no influence on Bauhaus (the band) except for being the sound, shape, energetic, and sensory birth name of our group."

Sound
Bauhaus combined these influences to create a gloomy, earnest and introspective version of post-punk, which appealed to many music fans who felt disillusioned in the wake of punk's collapse. Its crucial elements included Murphy's deep and sonorous voice, Ash's jagged guitar playing and David J's dub-influenced bass. Their sound and gloomy style would eventually come to be known as gothic rock or simply "goth".

According to David J, the band was "...always keen not to be a traditional ‘rock’ band, and we would go to great pains to avoid that well-trodden road." They experimented with various techniques and methods for song composition such as the Exquisite corpse on tracks such as "1. David Jay 2. Peter Murphy 3. Kevin Haskins 4. Daniel Ash" along with the use of Brian Eno's Oblique Strategies cards as well. To achieve some of the sound effects in their songs, various instruments  were implemented such as bottlenecks, echo units, a Syndrum, and an EBow.

In their second album Mask, expanded their sound with the addition of synthesizers, electronics and a saxophone to "add color and dynamics to each song." The album was less structured and spontaneous compared to their first album. The song Of Lillies and Remains is an example of this method. According to Murphy: ""Of Lillies and Remains" is a song that was written as it happened. None of it was rehearsed, worked out or played beforehand. We simply told the engineer to turn on the tape. That was incredibly exciting. That said a lot for our confidence and courage and total absurdity; that it was possible to demonstrate that those ideas form an artistic point of view, come from another outside force - i.e. the collective creative thing."

Lyrics
In their first album and singles, Bauhaus' songs dealt with taboo subjects such as martyrdom, paranoia, madness, obsession and prostitution. For example, the song Stigmata Martyr was about (according to Shirley) "...a person whose religious obsession with Christ takes the form of a physical manifestation of the crucifixion; i.e. nailmarks on the hands: "In a crucifixion, ecstacy, Lying cross checked in agony, Stigmata bleed continuously, Holes in head, hands, feet, and weep for me." When delivering these lyrics Peter became the stigmata." Murphy also commented on the misconceptions of the lyrics of the song: "I don't think the other members of the band really got what I was writing about, and the collective intention suddenly became very anti-religious. And that song is not an anti-religious song at all. The message is, really, the dangers of obsession, of almost psychosomatic induction of that masochism. That alone can be an illusion. And it's way off the mark as to the actual source of the message of any religious God. God doesn't want you to be in pain and die. It wasn't anti-religious. It wasn't demonic. It was alluding to the manifestation. Is it truly a mark of the Holy Ghost or is it simply an obsession condition? That's all there is to it." Another song, Dark Entries tells the story of title character Dorian Gray from Oscar Wilde's novel The Picture of Dorian Gray, which is Murphy's favorite novel. Murphy explains: "It was the first book with real substance that I chose for myself. It's a story of great narcissism and esoteric interior, and brilliantly written. It's a window into this personality, this Oscar Wilde chap I'd heard about. The language is so opulent. It's a rock star's story, really." The song A God In An Alcove was about "...the story of a fallen idol." The title track's In the Flat Field was inspired by "...the quotidian mundaneness of life in Northampton, and the desire to escape that ‘flat’ existence."

Other songs from later albums and singles, explored subjects such as nostalgia, desire, reflection, self-realization and hope. For example, the song All We Ever Wanted Was Everything was about the "...nostalgic memories of a time of innocence and naive yearning." Also, some of the song titles came from literary sources. For example, the song title Kick in the Eye was based on a line from the novel Satori In Paris by Jack Kerouac.

The construction of their lyrics were inspired by the Cut-up technique method. An example of their approach to lyric structure is the amalgamation of individual lyrics from each member in the song Of Lillies and Remains, as Murphy explained: "I'd written a dream out on a piece of paper and Dave picked up this piece of paper at random and found a blank side and wrote out a lyric. He turned it over and asked what it was. I said, "It's a dream." And so he said: "Let's do this." So David went in to do his half - no rehearsal - and then I took it from where he left off. That was a typical way of working."

Live Performances
In terms of live performances, Bauhaus' stage theatrics, specifically their lighting, was inspired by a Judas Priest concert that Murphy attended with Bauhaus' manager. They predominantly used black and white lighting for their live shows. When they were asked why in early interviews, David J responded, "...coloured lights are for Christmas trees." Their lighting was so minimal that sometimes the band would play in almost complete darkness where they were glimpsed rather than seen in their shows. Their manager Graham Bentley helped with the lighting, "I started doing lights for Bauhaus - which obviously came about because I was the person who was there - I got into it very much from the start. I love the shadows. I used to call it a dark show rather than a light show. The essential emphasis was less light." Bentley used industrial lights for the lighting and put the lights on the floor rather than the ceiling. Also, a strobe light would be used for Murphy to hold on to his body and move around with it on stage.

Legacy and influence 

Bauhaus are frequently considered to be the inventors of goth; however the band rejected this label, preferring to describe their style as "dark glam." Peter Murphy said he felt their contemporaries had a larger hand in solidifying what became goth. Likewise, Kevin Haskins felt that bands such as Siouxsie and the Banshees were more influential to goth subculture than themselves and mentioned that Bauhaus were "...more three dimensional, more art rock". Ash nevertheless admitted: "if you wear black and your first single is "Bela Lugosi's Dead," you’ve pretty much got a stamp on you. That's always been one of our strongest songs, so it's sort of undeniable".

Various bands and artists with goth associations pointed to Bauhaus as an inspiration, including Type O Negative, Alien Sex Fiend, Zola Jesus, Deine Lakaien, AFI, Buck-Tick, Lycia, Jaz Coleman (of Killing Joke), the Cult, Glenn Danzig (of Misfits), Greg Mackintosh (of Paradise Lost), She Wants Revenge, the Dresden Dolls, Soul Merchants, She Past Away and Wolfsheim. The Mission's Wayne Hussey even sang with Murphy on stage in 2013. Bauhaus were also influential upon many industrial rock groups and artists, like Ministry, Marilyn Manson, Nine Inch Nails, Nitzer Ebb, and Skinny Puppy.

In addition, Bauhaus were hailed by various alternative/indie rock performers and groups, including the Flaming Lips, Steve Albini (of Big Black), Jehnny Beth of Savages, Stephen Malkmus (of Pavement), Alan Sparhawk (of Low), Bradford Cox (of Deerhunter), Mark Lanegan (of Screaming Trees), Jesse Hughes (of the Eagles of Death Metal), Courtney Taylor-Taylor (of the Dandy Warhols), Jeff Ament (of Pearl Jam), Alex Henry Foster (of Your Favorite Enemies), Nicholas Thorburn (of Islands), Matt Noveskey (of Blue October), Jane's Addiction, Soundgarden, the Smashing Pumpkins, A Neon Rome, ...And You Will Know Us by the Trail of Dead, Hole, whose lead singer Courtney Love admitted that a lot of her songs are "complete Bauhaus rip-offs", Interpol, My Chemical Romance, the Twilight Sad, Shearwater, and Elliott Smith.

The group have been namechecked by several other prominent musical acts from other genres, including Jello Biafra (of the Dead Kennedys), Jonathan Davis (of Korn), the extreme metal band Celtic Frost, the lo-fi musician Ariel Pink, Maynard James Keenan (from Tool), electronic act Carl Craig, American record producer DJ Premier (of Gang Starr), the American comedian/musician Reggie Watts, the Iranian musician Azam Ali, the Japanese Visual kei musician Hide (of X Japan), the Japanese post-rock Mono, the Japanese heavy metal band Dir En Grey, whose lead singer Kyo listed Press the Eject and Give Me the Tape as his top record he would take to a desert island, the electronica act Moby, the trip hop band Massive Attack, the crust punk band Amebix, the shoegaze band Drop Nineteens, the psychedelic rock band White Hills, the noise rock band Today Is the Day, the nu metal band Coal Chamber, the extreme metal band Behemoth, the grindcore band Napalm Death, Randy Blythe (of Lamb of God), Fred Durst (of Limp Bizkit), Serj Tankian (of System of a Down), Sean Yseult (of White Zombie), Bilinda Butcher (of My Bloody Valentine), Stuart Braithwaite (of Mogwai) Blink-182 namedropped Bauhaus on their song "She's Out of Her Mind" on their California album. Duff McKagan of Guns N' Roses listed the Bauhaus compilation Bauhaus 1979–1983 in his 100 favorite albums list.

Alternative Press included Bauhaus in their 1996 list of "100 underground inspirations of the past 20 years."

The Bauhaus song "All We Ever Wanted Was Everything" (from The Sky's Gone Out) was covered by several artists and bands, including John Frusciante (guitarist of the Red Hot Chili Peppers), MGMT and Xiu Xiu (who recorded it in 2006 for their Tu Mi Piaci EP). Billy Corgan of the Smashing Pumpkins sang T. Rex's "Telegram Sam" and "All We Ever Wanted Was Everything" live on stage with Bauhaus in 1998. "Double Dare"  was covered by the alternative rock band the God Machine. "Hollow Hills" was covered by System of a Down. "Silent Hedges" (along with "Double Dare") was covered by the power metal band Nevermore.

"Bela Lugosi's Dead", was covered by numerous acts, including Until December (1986), the Electric Hellfire Club (1996), Opera IX (on 2000 album The Black Opera: Symphoniæ Mysteriorum in Laudem Tenebrarum), Sepultura (on 2001 album Nation), Nouvelle Vague (on 2006 album Bande à part), Chris Cornell (2007), Nine Inch Nails (2009), Trent Reznor with Murphy and TV on the Radio (2013), Massive Attack (2013), David J with Jill Tracy (2013), Chvrches (for the 2014 Vampire Academy soundtrack), Dead Cross (on their 2017 debut album) and the Damned (2019).

Cultural references 
Bauhaus's fanbase extends beyond music; the American novelist Chuck Palahniuk was influenced by the Bauhaus song "Bela Lugosi's Dead" when writing his 2005 novel Haunted. In James O'Barr's 1989 comic book The Crow, the facial features of Eric Draven were based on those of Peter Murphy. In Neil Gaiman's series The Sandman, Dream's face and appearance were also based on Murphy. Additionally, comic book writer Alan Moore wrote the sleeve notes of Mask and contributed an anonymous Bauhaus review called "Phantoms of the Teenage Opera" to the UK music paper Sounds.

The 1984 music video of the song "You're the Inspiration" from the American band Chicago featured lead singer Peter Cetera wearing a Bauhaus T-shirt.

In an interview at the CBGB, Axl Rose from Guns N' Roses is seen wearing a Bauhaus T-shirt.

In the Beavis and Butt-head season 3 episode "Meet God, Part II" (1993), they view and comment on a music video for Bauhaus' Bowie cover, "Ziggy Stardust".

Susie Lewis, the co-creator of the American animated series Daria, is a fan of the band and used their song "1. David Jay 2. Peter Murphy 3. Kevin Haskins 4. Daniel Ash" in the closing credits of episode 213, "Write Where it Hurts".

In the 2003 South Park episode "Raisins", Henrietta Biggle (one of the "goth kids") had a bedroom poster of "Blauhaus", a parody version of the band.

In the 2015–2016 American Horror Story season "American Horror Story: Hotel", "Bela Lugosi's Dead" is used in the opening episode, in line with the underlying horror/vampire theme of the series.

In the 2017 The Americans episode "Darkroom", the Bauhaus song "Slice of Life" is played in the background of the red room scene. It was ranked #8 in Vulture's list of "The 10 Best Musical Moments in The Americans".

Saturday Night Lives recurring "Goth Talk" skit used "Bela Lugosi's Dead" as its theme song.

Bauhaus' performance at Coachella in 2005 has been ranked #5 among LA Weekly as one of "The 20 Best Coachella Sets of All Time".

Bauhaus' appearance in the Tony Scott film The Hunger has been ranked #20 by Rolling Stone as "The 30 Greatest Rock & Roll Movie Moments". and #17 by Time Out as "The 50 Best Uses of Songs in Movies".

Band members 
 Daniel Ash – guitars, acoustic guitar, saxophone, lead and backing vocals
 Peter Murphy – lead and backing vocals, acoustic guitar, keyboards, melodica, congas
 Kevin Haskins – drums, keyboards, piano, backing vocals
 David J – bass, keyboards, percussion, lead and backing vocals

Discography 

 Studio albums

 In the Flat Field (1980)
 Mask (1981)
 The Sky's Gone Out (1982)
 Burning from the Inside (1983)
 Go Away White (2008)

References 
Citations

Sources

External links

 
4AD artists
English gothic rock groups
English post-punk music groups
Musical groups established in 1978
Musical groups disestablished in 2008
Musical groups reestablished in 2019
Metropolis Records artists
Musical groups from Northamptonshire
Beggars Banquet Records artists
1978 establishments in England
Let Them Eat Vinyl artists